Lioudmila Skavronskaia (born 23 March 1980) is a former Russian tennis player.

Skavronskaia has a career-high WTA singles ranking of 124, achieved on 19 July 2004. She also has a highest WTA doubles ranking of 270, reached on 19 November 2014. In her career, she won four singles titles and one doubles title on tournaments of the ITF Circuit.

Skavronskaia retired from professional tennis 2010.

ITF Circuit finals

Singles: 7 (4–3)

Doubles: 5 (1–4)

External links
 
 

Russian female tennis players
1980 births
Living people